Alejandro Goic may refer to:

 Alejandro Goic (actor), Chilean actor
 Alejandro Goić (bishop), Chilean bishop